Brownstone Productions is an American film and television production company founded by actress, director and producer Elizabeth Banks and Max Handelman. It is known for producing films in the Pitch Perfect franchise, Charlie's Angels (2019) and Cocaine Bear (2023).

History
Brownstone Productions was founded in October 2002 in Santa Clarita, California, U.S. by actress, director and producer Elizabeth Banks and her husband, sportswriter and producer Max Handelman. As of 2019, the company is headquartered inside the Universal Studios Lot in Universal City, California.

In January 2015, the company signed a two-year first-look deal with Universal Pictures from 2015 to 2017. In June 2015, the company signed a multi year production deal with Warner Bros. Television.

In 2019, the company re-signed its first-look deal with Universal Pictures, and production deal with Warner Bros. Television.

In June 2021, the company signed a first-look and multi-project development podcasting deal with Amazon, Inc.'s Audible.

Filmography

Films

Television

In Production

Films
 Tink (with Offspring Entertainment and Walt Disney Studios)
 White Girl Problems (with Lionsgate)
 Heist Society (with Lionsgate)
 The Paper Bag Princess (with LuckyChap Entertainment and Clubhouse Pictures)
 Uncanny Valley (with Michael De Luca Productions and Universal Pictures)
 Queen for a Day (with Paramount Players)
 Science Fair (with Universal Pictures)
 The Grace Year (with New Leaf Literary & Media and Universal Pictures)
 The Invisible Woman (with Universal Pictures)
 The Magic School Bus (with Marc Platt Productions and Scholastic Entertainment)
 Miss Conception (with Screen Gems)
 Bottoms (with Orion Pictures)
 International Sweethearts of Rhythm (with Pascal Pictures and Sony Pictures)
 Foreign Relations

Television
 Something To Celebrate (with Warner Bros. Television)
 Untitled "Single Dad" project (with Warner Bros. Television)
 The Trustee (with Warner Bros. Television)
 Girl Waits With Gun (with Amazon Studios and Warner Bros. Television)
 Superfecundation (with Screen Gems)
 Untitled "Greg Berlanti" project (with Berlanti Productions and Warner Bros. Television)
 Hoops (with SpringHill Entertainment)
 Strong Justice (with Edgewood Place Entertainment and Warner Bros. Television)
 Patty's Auto (with Warner Bros. Television)
 Over My Dead Body (with Warner Bros. Television)
 Love Me (with In Good Company and Warner Bros. Television)
 The Twelve (with Fox Entertainment and Warner Bros. Television)
 Mavenhood (with Warner Bros. Television)
 DC Super Hero High (with Warner Horizon Scripted Television)
 Borrowed Time (with Warner Bros. Television)
 Foxy (with Warner Bros. Television and Fox Entertainment)
 Bedrock (with Warner Bros. Animation and Fox Entertainment)
 Red Queen (with Warner Bros. Television Studios and Universal Television)
 Where the Fore Are We? (with Amazon Studios)

Podcasts

References

Brownstone Productions
Elizabeth Banks
Mass media companies established in 2002
Film production companies of the United States
Television production companies of the United States